Idun was a Swedish magazine published in Sweden from 1887 to 1963. It was named after the goddess Idun, who appears with her basket of apples on its masthead.

History and profile 
Idun was founded by Frithiof Hellberg and C. E. Gernandt in 1887. The subtitle of the magazine was "A Practical Weekly Magazine for Women and the Home".

Idun focused on literature and gender equality. Several poems were also published in the magazine.

The magazine merged with Åhlén & Åkerlunds's Vecko-Journalen in 1963. The merged magazine was published weekly under the double-barrelled name .  In 1980, falling circulation figures forced it to a monthly cycle, and it was renamed Månadsjournalen (meaning 'Monthly Record' in English). The magazine ceased publication in 2002.

References

External links
Editions of Idun 1887–1918 digitized by Gothenburg University Library

1877 establishments in Sweden
1963 disestablishments in Sweden
Defunct magazines published in Sweden
Defunct literary magazines published in Europe
Magazines established in 1877
Magazines disestablished in 1963
Swedish-language magazines
Weekly magazines published in Sweden